The N7 road is one of the national highways of Gabon. It connects the far north-east of the country at Makokou to the south-east at Franceville.

Towns located along the highway include:

Makokou
Bakwaka 
Okondja 
Lékori 
Akiéni 
Ngouoni 
Franceville

National highways in Gabon